Mary Burke (born 1959) is an American businesswoman

Mary Burke may also refer to:

Mary Burke (basketball) (born 1965), American women's college basketball coach
Marylouise Burke, American actress
Mary Burke Washington (1926–2014), American economist
Mary Griggs Burke (1916–2012), American art collector
Mary Burke (consort), (c. 1560–c. 1627), Irish noblewoman and consort of Brian O'Rourke